Sour sanding, or sour sugar, is a food ingredient that is used to impart a sour flavor, made from citric or tartaric acid and sugar. It is used to coat sour candies such as lemon drops and Sour Patch Kids, or to make hard candies taste tart, such as SweeTarts.

See also
Acidulant

References 

Food ingredients